Coolana is a rural locality in the Somerset Region, Queensland, Australia.

Geography
Coolana lies in the west of the Lockyer Creek catchment area.  Part of the northern boundary of Coolana follows Plain Creek at tributary of Lockyer Creek.  The east of the suburb rises towards the peak of Mount Stradbroke.  Lowood Minden Road traverses the locality from north to south.  Parts of the area are used for agriculture while much of the land is undeveloped.

History
The area was originally known as Hillside. In 1945, it became Coolana.

At the 2011 Australian Census Coolana recorded a population of 174.

References

External links

Suburbs of Somerset Region
Localities in Queensland